Adelanthaceae is a family of liverworts belonging to the order Jungermanniales.

Genera: (with how many species per genus)
 Adelanthus  Mitt. - 11 spp.
 Cuspidatula  Steph. - 7 spp.
 Denotarisia  Grolle - 1 sp.
 Jamesoniella  (Spruce) Carrington - 19 spp.
 Nothostrepta  R.M.Schust. - 2 spp.
 Pisanoa  Hässel - 1 sp.
 Protosyzygiella  (Inoue) R.M.Schust. - 1 sp.
 Pseudomarsupidium  Herzog - 5 spp.
 Syzygiella  Spruce - 56 spp.
 Vanaea  (Inoue & Gradst.) Inoue & Gradst. - 1 sp.
 Wettsteinia  Schiffn. - 4 spp.

References

Jungermanniales
Liverwort families